The Virginia–Virginia Tech men's basketball rivalry is an American College basketball rivalry between the men's basketball team of the University of Virginia (called Virginia in sports media and abbreviated UVA) and the men's basketball team of Virginia Polytechnic Institute and State University (called Virginia Tech and abbreviated VT). The two schools first met in 1915 and have played in every season since 1922. Since Virginia Tech's admission in the ACC in 2004, the teams have played twice annually.

History
The two teams first played in 1915, with the Cavaliers winning 39-21. The games are normally played on the schools' respective campuses, but, especially between 1976 and 2000, neutral sites throughout Virginia, such as Roanoke, Lynchburg, Richmond, and Norfolk hosted the games. In 2006, the teams had their lone meeting in the ACC men's basketball tournament; Virginia won 60-56 in the first-round match-up. Much like the teams' rivalry in American football, long winning streaks have defined the series with both teams possessing nine-game runs of such streaks. Virginia from 1978 to 1984 and Tech from 1948 to 1952 and again from 1958 to 1965.

Memorable games

2017: Stuck on the Rim
The No. 12 Cavaliers traveled to Blacksburg after beating the Hokies by 23  in Charlottesville. With Tech leading late in the first overtime period and London Perrantes cutting into the lane, it seemed certain that the Cavaliers would tie the game. Shockingly, the ball suspended itself on the rim and the possession arrow gave the ball back to the Hokies, who would go on to win 80-78 after a second overtime period. Hokie Seth Allen hit a short pull-up jumper to seal it.

Game results

See also
 Virginia–Virginia Tech football rivalry

References

College sports in Virginia
Virginia Cavaliers men's basketball
Virginia Tech Hokies men's basketball